Gonzalo Julián Gamarra Leyton (born 2 July 1999) is an Argentine professional footballer who plays as a left-back for Club Atlético Güemes.

Career
Gamarra played at youth level for Juventud Cooperativista, River Plate and Boca Juniors. He began his senior career with Maltese Premier League outfit Senglea Athletic in 2017. He made his debut on 23 September versus Tarxien Rainbows. A first sending off occurred on 4 March 2018 against Ħamrun Spartans, amid sixteen 2017–18 games. Gamarra left in mid-2018 for Italian Serie D team Gavorrano, though he'd rejoin Senglea in January 2019 after not playing for Gavorrano. After ten games for Senglea, Gamarra headed to Switzerland to sign for Challenge League club Chiasso. He was sent off in both his second and last appearance.

On 29 January 2021, having terminated his Chiasso contract two days prior, Gamarra signed with Croatian First League side Slaven Belupo. He debuted on 8 February by starting a home loss to Gorica, though would be substituted off for Frano Mlinar with twenty-eight minutes remaining.

Career statistics
.

References

External links

1999 births
Living people
Sportspeople from Chaco Province
Argentine footballers
Association football defenders
Argentine expatriate footballers
Expatriate footballers in Malta
Expatriate footballers in Italy
Expatriate footballers in Switzerland
Expatriate footballers in Croatia
Argentine expatriate sportspeople in Malta
Argentine expatriate sportspeople in Italy
Argentine expatriate sportspeople in Switzerland
Argentine expatriate sportspeople in Croatia
Maltese Premier League players
Swiss Challenge League players
Croatian Football League players
Senglea Athletic F.C. players
U.S. Gavorrano players
FC Chiasso players
NK Slaven Belupo players